Junior Commissioned Officer (JCO) is a term used for a group of military ranks which is higher than havildar (non commissioned officer) and lower than lieutenant (commissioned officer). The term is only used by Bangladesh, India, and Pakistan. Senior havildars are promoted to JCO rank on the basis of merit and seniority, restricted by the number of vacancies. JCOs are treated as a separate class and hold additional privileges. Primarily the term was associated with armies but since the 2000s India and Pakistan's navies and air forces are using the term to indicate their Chief Petty Officers and Warrant Officers.

The British Indian Army recruited Gurkha soldiers from Nepal since the 19th century and separate Gurkha Regiments were created for them, the Gurkha soldiers got same ranks as other Indian soldiers; the modern Nepal Army officially made the Indian Army rank system for their soldiers in 1960s through a series of reorganizations and the 'JCO' term is being used by them from then. After the secession of East Pakistan in 1971 the Bangladesh Army inherited the 'JCO' rank system from Pakistan Army though since early 2000s the army uses the Warrant Officer terms.

History
The JCO evolved from the Viceroy's Commissioned Officers (VCOs), established in the British Indian Army during the British Raj in 1885. The VCOs themselves succeeded the so-called native officers holding a commission from the Governor General. Gurkha regiments in British service had also their set of 'native officers' resp. VCOs, although their homeland Nepal was never a British colony. 

Under the British, there was a clear colonial context, with the VCOs being the highest ranks an Indian could attain. The full commissioned officers were British, from the 18th century to the beginning of the 20th century. However, that changed slowly under the principles of Indianisation. In 1905, a special (or one could say better a 'crippled' form) of King’s Commission in His Majesty’s Native Land Forces was instituted. Indians who had qualified through the Imperial Cadet Corps would earn a commission that was limited to having authority over Indian troops only. Its holders could not rise above the Major. From 1917, in the midst of World War I, Indians 'with good family background' became eligible to study at the Royal Military College, Sandhurst and earn a commission as King's Commissioned Indian Officer (KCIO). By the time of independence in 1947, there were many Indian (and Pakistani) officers who had graduated from Sandhurst or the Indian Military Academy.

Army
A Junior Commission is signed and awarded by the Havildar's commanding officer. This type of commission is inferior to that held by full commissioned officers.

In the army, JCOs have a separate mess (the JCOs' mess), and are entitled to travel in AC 2 Tier on the railways and by air economy class (while on temporary duty or other movements). In the infantry, all JCO ranks have the word subedar in them, whereas the cavalry equivalent is risaldar.

The JCO ranks in the Indian Army and the Pakistan Army (from highest to lowest) are:
Subedar Major/Risaldar Major
Subedar/Risaldar
Naib Subedar/Naib Risaldar

JCOs holding the rank of Naib Subedar or Subedar often serve as platoon commanders in an infantry company in place of lieutenants, with a major as the company commander and a captain as second-in-command. JCOs holding the rank of Subedar Major assist their battalion's commanding officer in the same way as a regimental sergeant major would, to the extent that the equivalent rank of regimental havildar major is now almost obsolete in the Indian Army. 

In the Indian Army, due to their long years of service, officers accord JCOs great respect and JCOs have a great amount of influence, especially in cases involving the enlisted ranks, their welfare and morale. Another custom religiously followed is that a JCO is never addressed using just his name or rank. The word sahib (sir) is added as a suffix, e.g. a subedar named Pritam Singh would be addressed as either Subedar Sahib or Pritam Singh Sahib.

Navy
Sailors receive a warrant on promotion to the rank of Chief Petty Officer and this is a certificate issued by the Commodore Bureau of Sailors on behalf  of the President of India/Pakistan to authenticate the promotion of a sailor to the Chief Petty Officer rank, as the CPO/MCPO II/MCPO I ranks are Junior Commissioned ranks. The Warrant is made on pre-printed stationery written by hand.

The JCO equivalent (or Chief Petty) ranks in the Indian Navy and Pakistan Navy are:
Master Chief Petty Officer Class 1Master Chief Petty Officer (Pakistan) 
Master Chief Petty Officer Class 2Fleet Chief Petty Officer (Pakistan)
Chief Petty Officer

Air Force
The JCO equivalent (or Warranted) ranks in the Indian Air Force and Pakistan Air Force are:
Master Warrant OfficerChief Warrant Officer (Pakistan)
Warrant Officer
Junior Warrant OfficerAssistant Warrant Officer (Pakistan)

Honorary commissions
There is also a custom of giving honorary commissions to deserving JCOs. Every year a list of eligible JCOs is drawn up and honorary commissions awarded to them. This could be at the time of retirement, or when still in service. Honorary commissioned officers may wear the appropriate rank insignia, but they do not become members of the officers' mess. They do, however, receive the pay and pension of their honorary rank. The honorary ranks in the various forces are:

Indian Army:
Honorary Lieutenant
Honorary Captain

Indian Navy:
Honorary Sub Lieutenant
Honorary Lieutenant

Indian Air Force:
Honorary Flying Officer
Honorary Flight Lieutenant

Generally, in official documents the JCO rank held by the person is also added before the Honorary Commission rank.

References

Bibliography 

Pakistan Army ranks
Military ranks of the Indian Army